Charlie Chan at the Race Track is the 12th film in the 20th Century Fox-produced Charlie Chan series starring Warner Oland in the title role.

Plot 
When a prominent racehorse owner winds up dead-allegedly kicked to death by his prized stallion, Charlie Chan is called in to investigate.  But when the indomitable detective discovers evidence of foul play, he's soon hot on the hooves of an international gambling ring with an evil plot to turn the racetracks of the world into a trifecta of terror!

Cast 

Warner Oland as Charlie Chan
Keye Luke as Lee Chan
Helen Wood as Alice Fenton
Thomas Beck as Bruce Rogers
Alan Dinehart as George Chester
Gavin Muir as Bagley
Gloria Roy as Catherine Chester
Jonathan Hale as Warren Fenton
George Irving as Major Kent
Max Wagner as Joe
Paul Fix as Lefty
 John Rogers as Mooney
Frankie Darro as Tip Collins
Frank Coghlan Jr as Eddie Brill
John H. Allen as Streamline Jones

External links
 
 
 

1936 films
1936 mystery films
American black-and-white films
Charlie Chan films
American horse racing films
Films directed by H. Bruce Humberstone
20th Century Fox films
American mystery films
Films scored by Samuel Kaylin
1930s English-language films
1930s American films